The Trashmen were an American rock band formed in Minneapolis, Minnesota, United States, in 1962. 
The original line-up of the group featured guitarists Tony Andreason and Dal Winslow, bassist Bob Reed, and drummer Steve Wahrer.

Along with Colorado-based contemporaries the Astronauts, the Trashmen have been described as "the premier landlocked Midwestern surf group of the '60s."  The band took their name from "Trashman's Blues", a song written and recorded in 1961 by Minneapolis musician Kai Ray (Richard Caire, 1935–2017), who later wrote songs for the band.

History

Pre-Trashmen 
Tony Andreason and Mike Jann were friends who learned and played guitar together, starting in 1955. They primarily played country. In 1957, at the Crystal Coliseum, Tony and Mike met Steve Wahrer, a drummer, Dallas "Dal" Winslow, a guitar player, and a saxophone player. Tony, Steve, Dal, and the saxophone player played as The String Kings for a brief time period. Mike wasn't part of the group, due to being more interested in country music. Tony met Jim Thaxter through Steve and Dale. Jim was a singer who was looking to front a band. "Jim Thaxter and the Travelers" was then formed with the following line-up: Jim Thaxter on lead vocals and guitar (tuned to a bass guitar); Tony Andreason on lead guitar; Dal Winslow on rhythm guitar; Tom Diehl on piano; and Steve Wahrer on drums. In Spring 1961, the group took a break as Tony and Jim had to go into the military. In February or March 1962, the two returned. However, disagreements on musical direction between the two caused Tony to leave the band. Steve and Dal left with him.

Early Trashmen 
Don (Woody) Wood joined the group on bass. After Don's friend showed the group a record called "The Trashmen’s Blues" by guitarist Tony Caire aka Kai Ray, Steve decided to call the band "The Trashmen". The group was primarily an instrumental group, with occasional lead vocals by Steve. Steve began to sing more and more. Tony has occasionally sung lead. Don left the band and was replaced by Bob Reed, picked from an audition. The group gained an interest in surf rock after listening to Dick Dale. A song called "Surfin' Bird" was conceptualized by Steve and was instantly liked by their audience at shows.

"Surfin' Bird" as first success 

The Trashmen's biggest hit was 1963's "Surfin' Bird", which reached No. 4 on the Billboard Hot 100 in the latter part of that year. The song was a combination of two R&B hits by The Rivingtons, "The Bird's the Word" and "Papa-Oom-Mow-Mow". Early pressings of the single credit the Trashmen's drummer and vocalist Steve Wahrer as the composer, but following a threat from The Rivingtons' legal counsel, the writing credit was removed from Wahrer and transferred to the members of The Rivingtons.

The song was later covered by The Ramones, The Cramps, Silverchair, The Psychotic Petunias, Pee-wee Herman, Equipe 84, and the thrash metal band Sodom. It has also been featured in several films, including Full Metal Jacket, Fred Claus, Pink Flamingos, Back to the Beach, and The Big Year.

"Surfin' Bird" was the subject of the episode "I Dream of Jesus" of the television series Family Guy, sending the song to No. 8 on the iTunes Top 10 Rock songs chart and No. 50 on the UK Singles Chart in 2009. It has since become a running gag on the show.

In 2010, a Facebook campaign was launched to send the song to No. 1 in the UK over the Christmas season; this was largely intended (as with Rage Against the Machine's "Killing in the Name", in 2009) as a protest against the takeover of the Christmas No. 1 spot by The X Factor winner's song. The track debuted in the UK Top Ten for the first time on December 19, at No. 3.

It was also featured in the video game Battlefield Vietnam.

Continuing of music career 
Beyond "Surfin' Bird", The Trashmen experienced limited success. In 1964, "Bird Dance Beat" reached No. 30 on the Billboard Hot 100 in the United States and was a top 10 hit in Canada. The group disbanded in 1967. A four-CD box set of their work was released by Sundazed Records.

Reunion 
The group made sporadic reunions in the 1970s and 1980s, performing together until Steve Wahrer died of throat cancer in 1989. Later, Tony Andreason's brother Mark replaced Wahrer as drummer. Reed's son Robin joined as a touring member in 2009 on drums, filling in for Mark Andreason.

In 1999, the Trashmen played at the Las Vegas Grind. They also performed in Illinois, Ohio, Wisconsin, and Spain in 2007 and 2008. 

The Trashmen toured Europe in 2008 and in 2010, performing in Germany, the Netherlands, France, Spain, Belgium, Italy, Austria, Norway, Sweden, and Finland.

The band recorded four tracks at Custom Recording Studios in Golden Valley, Minnesota, with longtime fan and guitarist Deke Dickerson, for the record label Major Label, releasing the 7" EP I'm a Trashman in March 2013. A full-length follow-up LP, Bringing Back the Trash, was released in April 2014. After several 2015 shows in the band's hometown of Minneapolis, the band re-entered retirement.

Members

Classic line-up 
 Tony Andreason – lead guitar, vocals (1962–1967, 1970s, 1982–2016)
 Dal Winslow – rhythm guitar, vocals (1962–1967, 1970s, 1982–2016)
 Bob Reed – bass guitar, vocals (1962–1967, 1970s, 1982–2016)
 Steve Wahrer – drums, lead vocals (1962–1967, 1970s, 1982–1989)

Other members 
 Jim Woody – bass guitar (1962); replaced by Bob Reed
 Mark Andreason – drums, backing vocals (1989–probably 2009)
 Robin Reed – drums, backing vocals (2009–2016)
 Deke Dickerson – guitar (2013–2014 (possibly featured in other years))

Discography

Albums

Compilations, live albums, and EPs

Singles

References

External links
 
 
 

Musical groups established in 1962
Musical groups disestablished in 1967
Musical groups from Minnesota
Surf music groups
1962 establishments in Minnesota
Protopunk groups